Rusín is a municipality and village in Bruntál District in the Moravian-Silesian Region of the Czech Republic. It has about 100 inhabitants.

Administrative parts

Villages of Hrozová and Matějovice are administrative parts of Rusín.

Geography
Rusín is situated in the Osoblažsko microregion on the border of with Poland. It lies in the Zlatohorská Highlands.

The Hrozová stream, a tributary of the Osoblaha, forms the Czech-Polish border, then flows across the territory, and then forms a part of the northwestern municipal border.

History
The first written mention of Rusín is in the will of Vok of Rosenberg from 1262. In 1331, Rusín was bought by Heinek of Głubczyce and annexed to the Głubczyce estate. He owned the village for about 20 years. After his death, Rusín was inherited by the Lords of Fullstein, who annexed it to the Fullstein estate and owned it in the following centuries.

Sights
The landmark of the Hrozová village is the parish Church of Saint Michael the Archangel. The church was first mentioned in 1309 and is as old as the village. The church was modified several times, but the core is an early Gothic building from the 13th century. The Baroque windows are from 1758. In 2013, extraordinarily large frescoes were unveiled in the church. It is a painting from the last third of the 13th century, and is one of the most important late Romanesque frescoes in the country.

The Chapel of the Virgin Mary on the Rusínský kopec was built in 1816 and has become a pilgrimage site. After it was destroyed in 1945, a replica was built on its original site in the 1990s, which again became a pilgrimage site.

The Matějovice Cave is a pseudokarst cave located in the sandstone rock close to Matějovice.

Twin towns – sister cities

Rusín is twinned with:
 Głubczyce, Poland

References

External links

Villages in Bruntál District